Cipargamin (NITD609, KAE609) is an experimental synthetic antimalarial drug belonging to the spiroindolone class. The compound was developed at the Novartis Institute for Tropical Diseases in Singapore, through a collaboration with the Genomics Institute of the Novartis Research Foundation (GNF), the Biomedical Primate Research Centre and the Swiss Tropical Institute.

Cipargamin is a synthetic antimalarial molecule belonging to the spiroindolone class, awarded MMV Project of the Year 2009. It is structurally related to GNF 493, a compound first identified as a potent inhibitor of Plasmodium falciparum growth in a high throughput phenotypic screen of natural products conducted at the Genomics Institute of the Novartis Research Foundation in San Diego, California in 2006.

Cipargamin was discovered by screening the Novartis library of 12,000 natural products and synthetic compounds to find compounds active against Plasmodium falciparum. The first screen turned up 275 compounds and the list was narrowed to 17 potential candidates. The current spiroindolone was optimized to address its metabolic liabilities leading to improved stability and exposure levels in animals. As a result, cipargamin is one of only a handful of molecules capable of completely curing mice infected with Plasmodium berghei (a model of blood-stage malaria). Given its good physicochemical properties, promising pharmacokinetic and efficacy profile, the molecule was recently approved as a preclinical candidate and is now entering GLP toxicology studies with the aim of entering Phase I studies in humans in late 2010. If its safety and tolerability are acceptable, cipargamin would be the first antimalarial not belonging to either the artemisinin or peroxide class to go into a proof-of-concept study in malaria. If cipargamin behaves similarly in people to the way it works in mice, it may be possible to develop it into a drug that could be taken just once - far easier than current standard treatments in which malaria drugs are taken between one and four times a day for up to seven days. Cipargamin also has properties which could enable it to be manufactured in pill form and in large quantities. Further animal studies have been performed and researchers have begun human-stage trials.

References

Antimalarial agents
Tryptamines
Chloroarenes
Spiro compounds
Novartis brands
Fluoroarenes